Gin Pit was a coal mine operating on the Lancashire Coalfield from the 1840s in Tyldesley, Greater Manchester then in the historic county of Lancashire, England. It exploited the Middle Coal Measures of the Manchester Coalfield and was situated to the south of the Tyldesley Loopline.

History
Gin Pit's name suggests it, or a predecessor, had horse driven winding gear and was on the site of even older coal workings. The colliery, owned by John Darlington, was isolated from roads resulting in the building of a narrow gauge tramway worked by horses to transport coal from the pit to the Bridgewater Canal at Marsland Green. In 1851 Darlington attempted to sell his colliery, tramroad, cranes and tipplers on the canal to the Bridgewater Trustees but the operation was sold to Samuel Jackson, a salt merchant and owner of a nearby colliery in Bedford.
The colliery's single shaft was deepened to the Rams mine at 375 yards between 1866 and 1872 by Astley and Tyldesley Coal and Salt Company. It had a pumping engine built by the Haigh Foundry.

In 1896 Gin Pit employed 240 underground and 55 surface workers producing household and steam coal and coal to produce gas. The seams worked were the Crombouke and Six Foot mines. In 1923 the colliery had 237 underground and 57 surface workers. In common with many collieries on the Lancashire Coalfield, women, known as Pit brow lasses were employed on the surface to sort coal on the screens at the pit head.  
The colliery was linked to St George's Colliery for ventilation.

The colliery became part of Manchester Collieries in 1929. In 1947 when the collieries were nationalised Gin Pit became part of the No 1 Manchester Area of the National Coal Board's (NCB) North Western Division. It ceased production in 1958.

Legacy
Gin Pit Village is a small settlement which is still inhabited, and the miners' welfare club is still open.

Boat building
Gin Pit also had a boat building operation. The narrow wooden box boats were taken to the canalside at Marsland Green by rail.

See also
List of Collieries in Astley and Tyldesley
Glossary of coal mining terminology

References

Citations

Bibliography

External links
Coal Mining, Gin Pit, Manchester Collieries, 1935 Manchester Archives+
 Gin Pits by Roger Hampson

Coal mines in Lancashire
Mining in Lancashire
Underground mines in England
Tyldesley